Michael Madl (born 21 March 1988) is an Austrian professional football coach and a former player who played as a defender. He works as a coach with the Austria Wien academy. He represented the Austria under-21 team.

Club career
Madl joined FK Austria Wien in 2004. On 1 September 2007, he was transferred to FC Wacker Innsbruck on a ten-month loan. Madl returned to Austria Wien on 1 July 2008.

Maldl joined English club Fulham of the Championship on loan until the end of the 2015–16 season on 29 January 2016. He scored his first goal for Fulham in a 3–0 win over Charlton Athletic on 20 February 2016. On 20 May 2016, Fulham announced the signing of Madl on a permanent deal, with the player signing a two-year contract, keeping him at the club until the summer of 2018.

On 16 January 2018, Madl re-signed with Austria Wien for an undisclosed fee.

International career
Madl was part of the Austrian team at the 2007 FIFA U-20 World Cup, where he helped his team to a fourth-place finish. He has been called up to the Austrian UEFA European Under-21 Championship Qualifying Squad.

Madl got his first call up to the senior Austria squad for a UEFA Euro 2016 qualifier against Russia in June 2015. He was called up again for another UEFA Euro 2016 qualifier against Liechtenstein in October 2015.

Career statistics

Club

References

External links
Profile at austria-archiv.at

1986 births
People from Judenburg
Living people
Association football defenders
Austrian footballers
Austria youth international footballers
Austria under-21 international footballers
Austrian expatriate sportspeople in England
Expatriate footballers in England
Austrian Football Bundesliga players
English Football League players
FK Austria Wien players
FC Wacker Innsbruck (2002) players
SC Wiener Neustadt players
SK Sturm Graz players
Fulham F.C. players
Austrian football managers
Footballers from Styria